Henry Roper was a Briton who served as Chief Justice of Bombay Supreme Court.

References 

19th-century English judges
Chief Justices of the Bombay High Court